The stylohyoid muscle is a slender muscle, lying anterior and superior of the posterior belly of the digastric muscle. It is one of the suprahyoid muscles. It shares this muscle's innervation by the facial nerve, and functions to draw the hyoid bone backwards and elevate the tongue. Its origin is the styloid process of the temporal bone. It inserts on the body of the hyoid.

Structure
The stylohyoid muscle originates from the posterior and lateral surface of the styloid process of the temporal bone, near the base. Passing inferior and anterior, it inserts into the body of the hyoid bone, at its junction with the greater cornu, and just superior to the omohyoid muscle. It belongs to the group of suprahyoid muscles.

It is perforated, near its insertion, by the intermediate tendon of the digastric muscle.

The stylohyoid muscle has vascular supply from the lingual artery, a branch of the external carotid artery.

Nerve supply
A branch of the facial nerve (CN VII) innervates the stylohyoid muscle.

Variation
It may be absent or doubled, lie beneath the carotid artery, or be inserted into the omohyoid, or mylohyoid muscles.

Function

The stylohyoid muscle elevates and retracts hyoid bone. It initiates a swallowing action by pulling the hyoid bone in a posterior and superior direction.

Additional images

See also
 Stylohyoid ligament

References

External links

Facial muscles
Suprahyoid muscles
Muscles of the head and neck